The title of SS and Police Leader designated a senior Nazi Party official who commanded various components of the SS and the German uniformed police (Ordnungspolizei), prior to and during World War II in the German Reich proper and in occupied territories.

Levels 
Three levels of subordination were established for holders of this title:

 SS and Police Leader (SS- und Polizeiführer, SSPF)
 Higher SS and Police Leader (Höherer SS- und Polizeiführer, HSSPF)
 Supreme SS and Police Leader (Höchster SS- und Polizeiführer, HöSSPF)

Establishment 
The office of Höherer SS- und Polizeiführer (Higher SS and Police Leader, HSSPF) was authorized by a decree of 13 November 1937, signed by Reich Interior Minister Wilhelm Frick. This decree authorized the creation of HSSPF in each of the 13 German armed forces Wehrkreise (Military Districts) in the German Reich, but only in the event of mobilization. At that time, the HSSPF would serve as deputies to Heinrich Himmler, the Reichsführer-SS and Chief of the German Police, for the purpose of coordinating and integrating all local and regional SS and police formations into the defense organization of the Reich. The first HSSPF activated were those appointed in the Wehrkreise bordering Austria during the Anschluss crisis in March 1938, and Czechoslovakia during the summer and autumn of the same year.

Appointments to these posts came from the ranks of existing SS-Oberabschnitte Führer (SS Main District Leaders), and in nearly all instances they held both positions simultaneously. The Oberabschnitte were the SS commands in each of the Wehrkreise. The purpose of the Higher SS and Police Leader was to be a direct command authority for every SS and police unit in these given geographical regions, answering only to Himmler and, through him, to Adolf Hitler. They were to act as Himmler's chief liaison to, and unifier of, all SS and police components in a region.

After the March 1938 Anschluss when Austria was absorbed into the German Reich, two new Wehrkreise and corresponding HSSPF were established there as well. Likewise, after the October 1939 conquest of Poland, two additional Wehrkreise and corresponding HSSPF were created for those Polish areas that were directly incorporated into the Reich.

However, in all other occupied territories, there was no Wehrkreise established, so the HSSPF existed as independent entities. However, they had something the Reich HSSPFs did not – several subordinate SS- und Polizeiführer (SS and Police Leader, SSPF) commands reporting to them. These positions were created beginning in November 1939 to assist the HSSPF in administering the large areas under their jurisdiction. 

Finally, in the autumn of 1943, Himmler created two Höchster SS- und Polizeiführer (Supreme SS and Police Leader, HöSSPF) posts with jurisdiction over very large territories; these were Italien (1943–1945) and Ukraine (1943–1944), each of which had both HSSPF and SSPF reporting to them.

Operations 
The SS and Police Leaders directly commanded a headquarters staff with representatives from almost every branch of the SS and the police. This typically included the Ordnungspolizei (Orpo; regular police), SiPo (security police) including the Gestapo (secret police), Totenkopfverbände (SS-TV; Nazi concentration camps), SD (intelligence service), and certain units of the Waffen-SS (combat units). Most of the HSSPF normally held the rank of SS-Gruppenführer or above, and answered directly to Himmler in all matters pertaining to the SS within their area of responsibility. Most SSPF normally held the rank of SS-Oberführer or SS-Brigadeführer and reported to their HSSPF. The role of all SS and Police Leaders was to be part of the SS control mechanism within their jurisdiction, policing the population and overseeing the activities of the SS men within each respective district. The HSSPF could bypass the chain of command of the administrative offices for the SS, SD, SiPo, SS-TV and Orpo in their district under the "guise of an emergency situation," thereby gaining direct operational control of these groups.

Himmler authorized SS and Police Bases (SS- und Polizeistützpunkte) to be established in occupied Poland and occupied areas of the Soviet Union. They were to be "armed industrialized agricultural complexes." They would also maintain order in the areas where they were established. However, they did not get beyond the planning stage.

In 1944 and 1945, many HSSPF were promoted to their corresponding general's rank in the Waffen-SS by Himmler. This was apparently an attempt to provide potential protection for them, by giving them combatant status under the Hague Convention rules of warfare.

War crimes and crimes against humanity

The SS and Police Leaders were key figures in many of the war crimes committed by SS personnel. The HSSPF served as commanding SS generals for any Einsatzgruppen (death squads) operating in their area.  This entailed ordering the deaths of tens of thousands of persons. In addition, they launched ruthless anti-partisan operations and directed police units to acquire forced labor for war-related projects.

The SS and Police Leaders were the overseeing authority of the Jewish ghettos in Poland and directly coordinated deportations to Nazi extermination camps. They had direct command over Order Police battalions and SD regiments that were assigned to guard the ghettos. The HSSPF regularly provided SS and police guards and other support personnel for the transports to the death camps, and also negotiated with the agencies and ministries of the Reich for rolling stock, supplies and provisions, rail schedules, and an array of other requirements necessary to keep the roundups and the death trains moving efficiently. And, in the satellite and client states, the HSSPF negotiated directly with the puppet or collaborationist governments to hand over their Jews for deportation to the East. Finally, the HSSPF were also directly involved in the construction and operation of the extermination camps. Following the end of the war, many SS and Police Leaders, particularly those who had served in Poland and the Soviet Union, either committed suicide or were charged with war crimes and crimes against humanity.

Tables of SS and police leaders
In addition to the two HöSSPF noted previously, there were some thirty-eight HSSPF commands, nineteen in the Reich and another nineteen in the occupied lands. Most of these had several different commanders over the lifetime of the post. Similarly, there were some forty-nine SSPF commands subordinated to those HSSPF leaders in the occupied territories, also with multiple commanders over the years. Some of these areas were renamed, merged, or dissolved during the duration of their existence, particularly as German military control over the eastern territories was relentlessly eroded later in the war. 

The tables below provide as complete an accounting of the SS and police commands and their leaders as is known. They list the permanent appointees, but omit any substitutes who temporarily acted in that capacity when the incumbent was on leave or on another assignment.

**SSPF originally slated to be assigned to HSSPF Kaukasien.

See also
 List of SS and police commands
 List of Nazi Party leaders and officials
 List of SS personnel
 Glossary of Nazi Germany

References

Notes

Citations

Bibliography

Further reading

Nazi SS